

Kurt Möhring (3 January 1900 – 18 December 1944) was a general in the Wehrmacht of Nazi Germany during World War II. He was a recipient of the Knight's Cross of the Iron Cross. Möhring was killed on 18 December 1944 in Befort, Luxembourg, during the Battle of the Bulge.

Awards  

 Knight's Cross of the Iron Cross on 18 July 1943 as Oberst and commander of Grenadier-Regiment 82

References

Citations

Bibliography

 

1900 births
1944 deaths
People from Kościerzyna County
People from West Prussia
Lieutenant generals of the German Army (Wehrmacht)
German Army personnel of World War I
Prussian Army personnel
Recipients of the clasp to the Iron Cross, 1st class
Recipients of the Gold German Cross
Recipients of the Knight's Cross of the Iron Cross
German Army personnel killed in World War II
Reichswehr personnel
German Army generals of World War II